Dejvická is a Prague Metro station on Line A. It lies at the eastern end of the main boulevard Evropská Třída.

History
The station was opened on 12 August 1978 as the western terminus of the inaugural section of Line A, between Leninova and Náměstí Míru. It was formerly known as Leninova after Vladimir Lenin, and renamed Dejvická in 1990 following the Velvet Revolution.

Dejvická station was built between 1973 and 1978 with a cost of 301 million Czech crowns.

The station served as the end of Line A until the extension to Nemocnice Motol was opened on 6 April 2015.

General information
The station serves and is named after the Dejvice district of Prague 6. The Dejvická Farmers' Market is located nearby and open on Saturdays.

Exits
The station has two exits
Western exit leading to Evropská Třída
Eastern exit leading to Victory Square.

Gallery

References

External links 

 Gallery and information  
 dpp.cz 

Prague Metro stations
Railway stations opened in 1978
1978 establishments in Czechoslovakia
Prague 6
Railway stations in the Czech Republic opened in the 20th century